João Paulo Lopes "J. P." Batista (born October 29, 1981) is a Brazilian former professional basketball player and current coach. He played college basketball at Gonzaga University and also started his coaching career with the Bulldogs as an assistant coach.

Early life
Batista was born and raised in Olinda, Pernambuco, attended Colegio Atual school in Olinda and was named State Player of the Year as a senior in 2001.

College career
Batista arrived at Gonzaga in 2004, after spending the first year of his college career at Western Nebraska Community College and the second at Barton County Community College in Kansas, where he mentored teammate and fellow international student Antanas Kavaliauskas. He finished his first season with Gonzaga averaging 12 points and 6 rebounds per game, and was named the top newcomer in the West Coast Conference.

Playing alongside the All-American Adam Morrison, Batista finished the 2005-06 NCAA basketball season averaging over 19 points and 9 rebounds per game, while shooting a remarkable 59 percent from the field and 83 percent from the free-throw line.

Professional career
Despite his impressive collegiate statistics, Batista was generally ignored by the scouts leading up to the 2006 NBA Draft, with his lack of athleticism and his age (he was nearly 25 at the time of the draft, unusually old for a college prospect) hindering his chances of being drafted. Batista played for the NBA's Minnesota Timberwolves entry in the Las Vegas Summer League, but he was not signed by the team.

He accepted an offer to play for Lietuvos rytas in Vilnius, Lithuania in the LKL and ULEB Cup. With Lietuvos rytas he played in the ULEB Cup and Lithuanian basketball Cup finals, and won the BBL championship. Their 2006-07 ULEB Cup run ended in a loss in the final to Real Madrid, but since Real had already qualified for the 2007-08 Euroleague through their league position, Lietuvos rytas received the Euroleague berth that normally goes to the ULEB Cup winners.

On June 16, 2014, he signed a two-year deal with French club Limoges CSP. With them he won the 2014–15 LNB Pro A championship. On June 25, 2015, he parted ways with Limoges.

On July 16, 2015, he returned to Brazil and signed with Flamengo.

On June 25, 2019, he has signed a contract with Le Mans Sarthe of the LNB Pro A.

Coaching career 
On August 14, 2022, Batista joined the Gonzaga Bulldogs as an assistant coach, thus returning to his alma mater after 16 years.

EuroLeague career statistics

|-
| style="text-align:left;"| 2007–08
| style="text-align:left;"| Lietuvos Rytas
| 11 || 0 || 8.0 || .516 || .000 || .556 || 1.5 || .2 || .1 || .0 || 3.4 || 2.0
|-
| style="text-align:left;"| 2008–09
| style="text-align:left;"| Le Mans
| 10 || 7 || 23.5 || .570 || .000 || .667 || 3.8 || 1.5 || .7 || .4 || 11.4 || 9.9
|-
| style="text-align:left;"| 2014–15
| style="text-align:left;"| Limoges CSP
| 10 || 1 || 17.1 || .455 || .000 || .818 || 2.1 || 1.0 || .2 || .2 || 7.8 || 6.0

National team career
Batista represents the senior men's Brazilian national basketball team and he was a part of the 2010 FIBA World Championship squad.

References

External links
 Profile at euroleague.net
 Profile at eurobasket.com
 Profile at espn.go.com
 Profile at fiba.com
 Profile at lnb.fr 

1981 births
Living people
2010 FIBA World Championship players
Barton Cougars men's basketball players
Basketball players at the 2007 Pan American Games
Basketball players at the 2015 Pan American Games
BC Rytas players
BK Barons players
Brazilian expatriate basketball people in France
Brazilian expatriate basketball people in Lithuania
Brazilian expatriate basketball people in the United States
Brazilian men's basketball players
Expatriate basketball people in Latvia
Flamengo basketball players
Gonzaga Bulldogs men's basketball players
Le Mans Sarthe Basket players
Limoges CSP players
Mogi das Cruzes Basquete players
Novo Basquete Brasil players
Pan American Games gold medalists for Brazil
Pan American Games medalists in basketball
People from Olinda
Power forwards (basketball)
Western Nebraska Cougars men's basketball players
Medalists at the 2015 Pan American Games
Sportspeople from Pernambuco